E1A-binding protein p400 is a protein that in humans is encoded by the EP400 gene.

Interactions
EP400 has been shown to interact with Transformation/transcription domain-associated protein, RuvB-like 1 and Myc.

References

Further reading